Ratner's Star is a 1976 novel by Don DeLillo.  It relates the story of a child prodigy mathematician who arrives at a secret installation to work on the problem of deciphering a mysterious message that appears to come from outer space. The novel has been described as "famously impenetrable".

The novel is described as Menippean satire and akin to the works of Thomas Pynchon. In critical reviews, the protagonist, Billy Twillig, is compared to Vonnegut's Billy Pilgrim.

The novel is told in two parts; the first is a conventional narrative, the second is less so. The author has said that the structural model was Alice's Adventures in Wonderland and Through the Looking-Glass. The novel develops the idea that science, mathematics, and logic—in parting from mysticism—do not contain the fear of death, and therefore offer no respite.

References 

1976 American novels
Novels by Don DeLillo
American science fiction novels
Alfred A. Knopf books